Diane Ackerman (born October 7, 1948) is an American poet, essayist, and naturalist known for her wide-ranging curiosity and poetic explorations of the natural world.

Education and career

Ackerman received a Bachelor of Arts in English from Pennsylvania State University and a Master of Arts, Master of Fine Arts and Ph.D. from Cornell University. Among the members of her dissertation committee was Carl Sagan, an astronomer and the creator of the Cosmos television series. She has taught at a number of universities, including Columbia and Cornell.

Her essays have appeared in The New York Times, Smithsonian, Parade, The New Yorker, National Geographic, and many other journals. Her research has taken her to such diverse locales as Mata Atlantic in Brazil (working with endangered golden lion tamarins), Patagonia (right whales), Hawaii (humpback whales), California (tagging monarch butterflies at their overwintering sites), French Frigate Shoals (monk seals), Toroshima, Japan (short-tailed albatross), Texas (with Bat Conservation International), the Amazon rainforest, and Antarctica (penguins). In 1986, she was a semi-finalist for NASA's Journalist-in-Space Project—this program was cancelled after the Space Shuttle Challenger (carrying Christa McAuliffe as a payload specialist with the Teacher in Space Project) disaster.  A molecule has been named after her—dianeackerone—a crocodilian sex pheromone.

A collection of her manuscripts, writings and papers (the Diane Ackerman Papers, 1971–1997—Collection No. 6299) is housed at the Cornell University Library.

Books
Her works of nonfiction include, most recently, The Human Age: The World Shaped by Us, which celebrates nature, human ingenuity, and explores how we've become the dominant force of change on the planet; her memoir One Hundred Names for Love, about stroke, aphasia, and healing; Dawn Light, a poetic meditation on dawn and awakening; The Zookeeper's Wife, narrative nonfiction set in Warsaw during World War II, a tale of people, animals, and subversive acts of compassion; An Alchemy of Mind about the marvels and mysteries of the brain, based on modern neuroscience; Cultivating Delight, a natural history of her garden; Deep Play, which considers play, creativity, and our need for transcendence; A Slender Thread, about her work as a crisis line counselor; The Rarest of the Rare and The Moon by Whale Light, in which she explores the plight and fascination of endangered animals; A Natural History of Love, a literary tour of love's many facets; On Extended Wings, her memoir of flying; and A Natural History of the Senses, an exploration of the five senses.

Her poetry has been published in leading literary journals, and in collections, including Jaguar of Sweet Laughter: New and Selected Poems. Her first book of poetry, The Planets, A Cosmic Pastoral was gifted by Carl Sagan to Timothy Leary while Leary was imprisoned. Her verse play, Reverse Thunder, celebrates the passionate and tragic life of the 17th century nun, and fellow poet and naturalist, Juana Inés de la Cruz. Ackerman also writes nature books for children.

Adaptations
A movie adaptation of Ackerman's book, The Zookeeper's Wife, starring Jessica Chastain as Antonina Żabińska, was released in the US on March 31, 2017. More photos of the Warsaw Ghetto Uprising of The Zookeeper's Wife may be seen at the website called "The House Under the Crazy Star".

In 1995, Ackerman hosted a five-part Nova miniseries, Mystery of the Senses, based on her book, A Natural History of the Senses. On Extended Wings was adapted for the stage by Norma Jean Giffin, and was performed at the William Redfield Theater in New York City (1987). A musical adaptation (by Paul Goldstaub) of her dramatic poem, Reverse Thunder, was performed at Old Dominion University (1992).

Awards and honors
In 2015, Ackerman's The Human Age won the National Outdoor Book Award in the Natural History Literature category and PEN New England's Henry David Thoreau Prize for nature writing. In 2012, she was a finalist for both a Pulitzer Prize and a National Book Critics Circle Award for One Hundred Names for Love. The Zookeeper's Wife received an Orion Book Award in 2008. She has received a D. Lit from Kenyon College, Guggenheim Fellowship, John Burroughs Nature Award, Lavan Poetry Prize, and has been honored as a Literary Lion of the New York Public Library. Ackerman has had three New York Times bestsellers: The Human Age (2014), The Zookeeper's Wife (2008), and A Natural History of the Senses (1990).
She is a Fellow of the New York Institute for the Humanities.

Personal life
Ackerman was married to the novelist Paul West (1930–2015). She lives in Ithaca, New York.

Selected works

Poetry
The Planets: A Cosmic Pastoral (1976) 
Wife of Light (1978)
Lady Faustus (1983)
Reverse Thunder (1988)
Jaguar of Sweet Laughter: New and Selected Poems (1991) 
I Praise My Destroyer (1998) 
Origami Bridges (2002)

Non-fiction 
’’Why Leaves Turn Color in the Fall’’
Twilight of the Tenderfoot (1980)
On Extended Wings (1985)
A Natural History of the Senses (1990) 
The Moon by Whale Light, and Other Adventures Among Bats and Crocodilains, Penguins and Whales (1991)
A Natural History of Love (1994) 
The Rarest of the Rare (1995)
A Slender Thread (1997) 
Deep Play (1999) 
Cultivating Delight (2002)
An Alchemy of Mind: The Marvel and Mystery of the Brain (2004)
The Zookeeper's Wife: A War Story (2007) 
Dawn Light: Dancing with Cranes and Other Ways to Start the Day (2009)
One Hundred Names for Love: A Stroke, a Marriage, and the Language of Healing (2011) 
The Human Age: The World Shaped By Us (2014)

Children's books 
Monk Seal Hideaway (1995)
Bats: Shadows in the Night (1997)
Animal Sense (poetry), illustrated by Peter Sis. (2003)

References

Further reading
 Becher, Anne, and Joseph Richey, American Environmental Leaders: From Colonial Times to the Present (2 vol, 2nd ed. 2008) vol 1 online p. 4.

External links 

Diane Ackerman Op-Eds The New York Times
 

American women poets
American science writers
Living people
1948 births
Writers from Illinois
American naturalists
American gardeners
People from Waukegan, Illinois
Pennsylvania State University alumni
Cornell University alumni
University of Pittsburgh faculty
Cornell University faculty
Columbia University faculty
Women science writers
American women farmers
American women non-fiction writers
Science communicators
American women academics
21st-century American women